The mixed doubles tournament at the 1989 French Open was held from 29 May until 11 June 1989 on the outdoor clay courts at the Stade Roland Garros in Paris, France. Manon Bollegraf and Tom Nijssen won the title, defeating Horacio de la Peña and Arantxa Sánchez Vicario in the final.

Seeds

Draw

Finals

Top half

Section 1

Section 2

Bottom half

Section 3

Section 4

External links
1989 French Open – Doubles draws and results at the International Tennis Federation

Mixed Doubles
French Open by year – Mixed doubles